The Pentax MG is a camera that was produced by Asahi Optical Co from 1981 until 1984. The Pentax MG replaced the Pentax MV and MV1 cameras as an entry level 35mm semi-automatic camera.

The Pentax MG was a manual focus, aperture priority camera, with no manual settings of speeds. The Pentax MG had an electronic focal-plane shutter from 1s to 1/1000, synchronized at 1/100. The shutter curtains were metal and had a vertical movement. However, if the batteries fail the camera still operated at 1/100s or B, thus the selector around the release button had three positions: Auto, 100X (1/100, X sync) and B. The exposure meter is center-weighted TTL type with open aperture measuring for Pentax M compatible lenses. The Pentax MG can use any Pentax K-mount and can still be used with current Pentax lenses. There was a self-timer and a hot shoe with an additional contact for dedicated Pentax flash units. The Pentax MG used 2 SR-44 batteries or equivalent to power it.

The Pentax MG had a 0.87x viewfinder, covering 92% of the field. The finder screen was fixed, with a split image and a microprism ring in the center. The shutter speed chosen by the camera was displayed in the finder by LEDs, which also indicated over/under exposure or slow speeds and the possibility of shaking. However, the aperture was not displayed. The camera also had an exposure compensation from +2 to -2 EV.

The body resembles that of the M-Family of cameras such as the ME, MX, MV, etc. and as such was compatible with the external Winder ME (1.5 frame/s) or the later Winder ME II (2 frame/s). The Pentax MG could use the Dial Data ME databack with an adaptor to slide in the hot shoe, or it could make direct use of the Digital Data M databack. The Pentax MG was available in chrome or black finish.

See also
List of Pentax products

References

External links
 The Pentax M series at krg site
 Bojidar Dimitrov's Pentax K-mount site
 Pentax-Manuals.com Manual for the Pentax Manual Focus cameras
 Magic Lantern Guides: Pentax Classic Cameras: K Series M Series Lx Series Spotmatic Series on Amazon

MG
Products introduced in 1981
135 film cameras
Pentax K-mount cameras